August Wilhelm Holmström (2 October 1829 – 1903) was a Finnish silver- and goldsmith. Born in Helsinki, Finland, he became an apprentice at the workshop of jeweller Karl Herold in St. Petersburg 1845—1850, master in 1857 with his own workshop.

Senior member of Fabergé's workshop, he was head jeweller and also produced parts for composite articles. He died in St. Petersburg.  His son Albert Holmström  (1876—1925) continued in his father's footsteps after his death and used the same mark, AH.

His daughter Hilma Alina Holmström (1875—1936) and granddaughter Alma Pihl (1888—1976) were both jewellery designers and workmasters at Fabergé. Alma designed the Winter Easter Egg and the Mosaic Easter Egg. Grandson Oskar Woldemar Pihl (1890—1959) was also a jeweller and goldsmith.

References

Sources
 G.von Habsburg-Lothringen & A.von Solodkoff, Fabergé - Court Jeweler to the Tsars (1979)
 Geoffrey Watts, Russian Silversmiths' Hallmarks (1700 to 1917) (2006) 
 Ulla Tillander-Godenhielm,  Fabergén suomalaiset mestarit (Fabergé's Finnish masters) (2011)

1829 births
1903 deaths
Artists from Helsinki
Finnish goldsmiths
Finnish silversmiths
Fabergé workmasters
Finnish people from the Russian Empire